The 2020 Offaly Senior Hurling Championship was the 122nd staging of the Offaly Senior Hurling Championship since its establishment by the Offaly County Board in 1896. The beginning of the championship was postponed indefinitely due to the impact of the COVID-19 pandemic on Gaelic games. The championship eventually began on 31 July 2020 and, after being suspended once again, eventually ended on 14 August 2021.

St Rynagh's entered the championship as the defending champions.

The final was played on 14 August 2021 at Bord na Móna O’Connor Park in Tullamore, between St Rynagh's and Kilcormac–Killoughey, in what was their second meeting in a final in three seasons. St Rynagh's won the match by 1-19 to 1-13 to claim their 19th championship title overall and a second title in succession.

Results

Group 1

Group 1 table

Group 2

Group 2 table

Knockout stage

Semi-finals

Final

References

Offaly Senior Hurling Championship
Offaly Senior Hurling Championship
Offaly Senior Hurling Championship